WZLA-FM (92.9 FM) is a radio station broadcasting a classic country format serving the Lakelands area of South Carolina. Licensed to Abbeville, South Carolina, the station is currently owned by Greeson Media Group.

Previous logo

External links

ZLA-FM